Zenodotus (fl. 150 BC) was a Stoic philosopher. He was a pupil of Diogenes of Babylon. He is mostly known from the short biography of him in Diogenes Laertius' Lives of the Philosophers.

An Athenian ephebic decree of 122/1 BC records that he gave lectures to the ephebes at the Ptolemaeum and the Lyceum throughout the year and honours the ephebes for their diligence in attending.

Poetry
Diogenes Laërtius recorded the epitaph Zenodotus wrote for Zeno of Citium:

Dedications
Chrysippus dedicated a two-book treatise on proverbs to Zenodotus.

References

2nd-century BC Greek people
Stoic philosophers